Cary Grant (January 18, 1904 – November 29, 1986) was an American actor, known as one of classic Hollywood's definitive leading men. He was known for his transatlantic accent, debonair demeanor, light-hearted approach to acting, and sense of comic timing. Grant acted in at least 76 films between 1932 and 1966. In 1999, the American Film Institute named Grant the second-greatest male star of Golden Age Hollywood cinema (after Humphrey Bogart).

Grant first began acting in Broadway plays in the 1920s, going by his birth name Archie Leach. He made his film debut with a minor role in This Is the Night (1932). Beginning in the 1930s, Grant appeared in over 20 radio programs, usually Lux Radio Theatre.

In 1940, Grant appeared opposite Rosalind Russell in His Girl Friday. Grant was nominated twice for the Academy Award for Best Actor in Penny Serenade (1941) and None but the Lonely Heart (1944). He portrayed composer and songwriter Cole Porter in Night and Day (1946). In 1955, he acted alongside Grace Kelly in the Alfred Hitchcock-directed To Catch a Thief. He appeared in Houseboat (1958) with Sophia Loren. That year he also appeared in Indiscreet with Ingrid Bergman, for which he was nominated for a Golden Globe Award for Best Actor. In 1959, Grant starred alongside Eva Marie Saint in the Alfred Hitchcock-directed North by Northwest. His next role was alongside Doris Day in That Touch of Mink (1962). His performance opposite Audrey Hepburn in Charade (1963) garnered him a nomination for the BAFTA Award for Best Actor in a Leading Role. Grant's final film was Walk, Don't Run (1966), retiring to raise his newborn daughter. He died twenty years later in 1986.

Filmography

Theatre

Radio

References

External links
Cary Grant on IMDb
Cary Grant at the Rotten Tomatoes

Male actor filmographies
American filmographies